Quicksilver was an ISP based in Parnell, Auckland, New Zealand. It offered broadband, dialup and toll's services around New Zealand. Quicksilver was an activity of Mercury Telecommunications Ltd, a company formed by Matthew Hobbs and Mark Frater, both ex-employees of CLEAR Communications.

Quicksilver was sold to Woosh, an Auckland-based wireless ISP in August 2006.

Internet service providers of New Zealand
New Zealand companies established in 1999
Telecommunications companies established in 1999 
Telecommunications companies disestablished in 2006
Companies based in Auckland
2006 disestablishments in New Zealand